Bruce Walker may refer to:

Bruce Walker (American football) (born 1972), American football player
Bruce Walker (Canadian football) (born 1955), wide receiver in the Canadian Football League
Bruce Walker (footballer) (born 1946), English footballer
(Robert) Bruce Walker (politician, born 1870) (1870–1932), New South Wales politician
(Ronald) Bruce Walker (politician, born 1897) (1897–1981), his son, New South Wales politician
Bruce Walker (rugby league) (born 1952), Australian rugby league footballer
Bruce D. Walker, American physician
Bruce J. Walker, American engineer, lawyer and government official